A rabbit punch is a blow to the back of the head or to the base of the skull. It is considered especially dangerous because it can damage the cervical vertebrae and subsequently the spinal cord, which may lead to serious and irreparable spinal cord injury. A rabbit punch can also detach the victim's brain from the brain stem, which can kill instantly.

Etymology
The term was coined in 1915. The punch's name is derived from the use of the technique by hunters to kill rabbits with a quick, sharp strike to the back of the head.

Combat sports
The rabbit punch is illegal in boxing, MMA, and other combat sports that involve striking. The only exceptions are no-holds-barred events such as the International Vale Tudo Championship (prior to rule changes in mid-2012).
On October 17, 2015, Prichard Colón, a well known boxer, was struck on the back of the head multiple times by his opponent, Terrel Williams by using the rabbit punch. During the match, Colón experienced dizziness as a result of the illegal punches. After the match ended, Colón began to tremble from his legs and started to vomit. He was rushed to the hospital where he was diagnosed with brain bleeding and underwent surgery. He was in a coma for 221 days (7 months, 1 week) until he was transferred to his mother's house. As a result of the injuries he sustained, Colón fell into a persistent vegetative state where he no longer could move or talk. As of July 2021, 6 years after the fight, Colón is doing much better, making more progress and is getting treatment for his condition.

Amateur sports

On June 29, 2014, soccer referee John Bieniewicz was punched in the neck by Baseel Abdul Amir Saad, an upset player in an amateur match he was officiating in Livonia, Michigan, a suburb of Detroit. Bieniewicz died two days later of his injuries, and Saad was charged with second-degree murder. Bieniewicz's autopsy showed that the force of the impact on the left side of his neck just below the base of his skull had resulted in a rare injury with twisted and torn arteries around the base of his skull, knocking him out before he hit the ground.  In 2015, Saad pled guilty to manslaughter and received a sentence of 8 to 15 years in prison.

See also
Donkey punch

References

Boxing terminology
Kickboxing terminology
Punches (combat)
Violence in sports
Banned sports tactics
Skull